"Devuélveme La Navidad" is a song by Bachata duo Xtreme featuring Carlos & Alejandra, who are also a Bachata duo. It served as the third single for their fourth album, Chapter Dos: On the Verge (2009).

Charts

References

2009 songs
2009 singles
Xtreme (group) songs